Deutch may refer to:
 Howard Deutch, an American film director
 John M. Deutch, former U.S. Deputy Secretary of Defense and Director of Central Intelligence
 Ted Deutch, Democratic congressman representing the state of Florida
 Zoey Deutch, an American actress and daughter of Howard Deutch and Lea Thompson

See also 
 Deutsch (disambiguation)
 Deutsche (disambiguation)
 Deutsch
 Deutschland
 Diana Deutsch